The Curtiss S was a  water-cooled 6-cylinder in-line aero-engine.

References

Curtiss aircraft engines